The Aeromarine Plane and Motor Company was an early American aircraft manufacturer founded by Inglis M. Upperçu which operated from 1914 to 1930. From 1928 to 1930 it was known as the Aeromarine-Klemm Corporation.

History
The beginnings of the company dated to 1908, when Uppercu began to finance aeronautical experiments by the Boland brothers at Keyport, New Jersey. In 1914, Aeromarine itself was founded at Keyport with Uppercu as president. Aeromarine built mostly military seaplanes and flying boats, the most significant of which were the models 39 and 40. The company broke new ground in aviation by offering some of the first regularly scheduled flights. Aviation promoter Harry Bruno worked with Aeromarine to commercialize the transportation potential of airflight.

In 1928, the firm was renamed Aeromarine-Klemm Corporation and began producing mostly Klemm aircraft designs, until the Great Depression forced its closure in 1930.

The firm also built aero engines. After Aeromarine itself went out of business, the production of Aeromarine engines was continued by the Uppercu-Burnelli Corporation.

A subsidiary "Aeromarine Sightseeing and Navigation Company" merged with Florida West Indies Airways, Inc to form the Aeromarine West Indies Airways, later renamed to "Aeromarine Airways". it operated the Aeromarine 75 and Aeromarine 85 aircraft.

Products

Aircraft

Engines

References

Notes

Bibliography

External links

 The Aeromarine Website
 

Companies based in Monmouth County, New Jersey
Defunct companies based in New Jersey
Defunct aircraft engine manufacturers of the United States
Defunct aircraft manufacturers of the United States
Keyport, New Jersey